Natalie Taylor (née Purcell; born 24 December 1982) is a New Zealand professional basketball player. She was a member of New Zealand women's national basketball team at the 2008 Beijing Olympics. She scored five points in the game they played against China, which they were defeated 80–63.

Taylor has been re-signed for the BDS Logan Thunder in the Women's National Basketball League (WNBL) for 2011/2012. She played for the University of Limerick in the Irish Superleague in the 2010/2011 season after previously playing for the BDS Logan Thunder in the 2008-09 & 2009-10 WNBL seasons. In 2007 Taylor returned to New Zealand to debut for the New Zealand Tall Ferns national basketball team and play for the inaugural Christchurch Sirens in the WNBL. She was MVP for New Zealand's Women's Basketball League (WBL) in 2007. She captained her Southeast Missouri State women's basketball team in the 2004-05 & 2005-06 NCAA seasons and broke school history by making the NCAA tournament for the first time in 2006 with an opening game against Stanford University.

Taylor is a member of the Church of Jesus Christ of Latter-day Saints. She is the younger sister of fellow New Zealand female professional basketball player and Latter-day Saint Charmian Mellars.

She is married to Ezra Taylor (former Queensland Reds Super Rugby player now playing in the Pro14).

Sources
 Mormon Times article, 13 August 2008

1984 births
Living people
New Zealand women's basketball players
New Zealand Latter Day Saints
Southeast Missouri State University alumni
Olympic basketball players of New Zealand
Basketball players at the 2008 Summer Olympics
Basketball players at the 2018 Commonwealth Games
Commonwealth Games bronze medallists for New Zealand
Commonwealth Games medallists in basketball
New Zealand expatriate basketball people in Australia
Small forwards
Medallists at the 2018 Commonwealth Games